Middleton, Lancashire is a civil parish in Lancaster, Lancashire, England. It contains nine listed buildings that are recorded in the National Heritage List for England.  All of the listed buildings are designated at Grade II, the lowest of the three grades, which is applied to "buildings of national importance and special interest".  The parish contains the village of Middleton, and at one time the Middleton Tower Holiday Camp, which converted some of the existing buildings for its purposes.  Otherwise the parish is mainly rural.  Most of the listed buildings are, or originated as, houses, farmhouses and associated structures.  In addition a folly and a public house are listed.

Buildings

References

Citations

Sources

Lists of listed buildings in Lancashire
Buildings and structures in the City of Lancaster